Who's Lila? is a video game developed by Russian independent game studio Garage Heathen, released in February 2022. Described as a "reverse-detective adventure", the game is an adventure game notable for using the manipulation of facial expressions as the means that the player uses to communicate with characters in the game.

Plot 

Who's Lila? is played from the perspective of the protagonist, William, a teenager who finds it "difficult to express emotions" and has to make "a conscious decision each time [he] moves a muscle". The game features a nonlinear narrative surrounding the disappearance of classmate Tanya Kennedy, as William must act naturally in the face of suspicion from classmates and authorities as the last person who saw her alive. The player is required to make branching choices through multiple playthroughs to discover multiple endings that provide greater insight into several emerging mysteries in the game, including the circumstances of Tanya's disappearance, the deeper aspects of William's psyche, and the identity of the titular Lila.

Gameplay 

Who's Lila is an adventure game played in two sections across a split-screen user interface. On the left-hand side of the screen, the player controls movement and interaction with the game world. On the right-hand side, the player manipulates a close-up representation of their face. During opportune moments in dialog with characters, the player influences the response given, or reactions to the player, by manually manipulating parts of their face using the cursor. The game uses a "neural network-powered emotion detection" to determine one of six emotions represented: happy, scared, surprised, sad, angry, or neutral. Player choices are complicated by the use of a time limit and moving facial features to add challenge to expressing the desired emotion, although an 'easy mode' provides players with the option to remove these from the game.

Who's Lila? also integrates elements similar to an alternate reality game as players complete puzzles using elements extraneous to the game, including the use of information from social media pages depicting fictional characters, and a separate program to run parallel to the game to unlock certain events. The game also features nonlinear gameplay requiring players to restart the game multiple times, with previous endings being depicted by tarot cards that can be used with a character in the game to offer additional insight on the mysteries of the game. The game features 15 endings, although additional hidden endings are available.

Development 

Garage Heathen released a demo version of Who's Lila on 11 August 2021, and on 2 February 2022 announced a release date of the game for 23 February of that month. A soundtrack featuring music from the game was released on 25 March.

Reception 

Who's Lila? received positive reception from gaming publications, with Rock Paper Shotgun citing the game as one of the publication's "favorite games of 2022", and described as the "most unique indie game" of the year, with praise directed towards the novelty of its facial manipulation mechanic and its horror themes.

Critics praised the innovative the approach to interaction through manipulating facial expressions. Rock Paper Shotgun noted the mechanic was "both incredibly clever and incredibly creepy", with the "face-pulling (proving) to be both a clever part of the plot and a genuine source of tension." Calum Fraser of Alpha Beta Gamer noted the game was "very unique" and "the facial expression manipulation isn't just a gimmick - it's an integral part of the gameplay that has a big effect on how others react to you." Cass Marshall of Polygon stated she "had fun yanking William's face into increasingly silly expressions...there's nothing quite like the joy of having him bare his teeth and pull his eyelids back and have it register as a friendly smile." Joel Couture of Indie Games Plus stated the "conversational tool" was "unique" and "endlessly enjoyable", although noting the feature "did sometimes break the mood of the game just a tiny bit".

Who's Lila? also received praise for its merits as a horror game. Cass Marshall of Polygon stated the game was "horror at its best - an unfurling, increasingly distressing mystery that risks engulfing the characters and town around it". Writing for TheGamer, Khee Hoon Chan praised the game's "bold and interesting concept", stating "the eeriness of its one-bit horror does persist hours later due to its unsettling, cryptic scenes, and its central mystery is compelling enough that you'll want to revisit the horrors in Who's Lila over and over again." Meredith McNally stated that the visual style was an additional element that contributed to the atmosphere of the game, with the "limited palette (doing) wonders for the mood of the game overall, especially when it changes in key moments", and praising the facial mechanic as offering "interesting effects", with "the ability to watch Will's automatic expressions in certain scenarios" being "incredibly eerie."

Many critics noted that Who's Lila? raised themes as a surrealist and psychological horror game. Many critics raised comparisons between the game and the work of David Lynch, with the game advertised as directly inspired by the filmmaker's work. Khee Hoon Chan of TheGamer stated that the game raised interesting questions around "the anxieties and horrors of social interactions", including "what our reliance on facial expressions (says) about social interactions", expressing a wish the game would explore these themes more profoundly. Further discussing the performance of "being human", Lin Virgil Hansley of DreadXP states the game "brings me to feel a (very real) attachment to this game...there are people who struggle to interact socially because emotions and empathy don't come as naturally to them...knowing people like this, even sometimes feeling these things myself, Who's Lila? is a game that oddly makes me feel understood." Meredith McNally of Comic Book Reviews stated the paranormal subject matter of Who's Lila? explores themes that "no other games have dealt with" and the "unique subject matter pushes (the game) into the forefront of the indie sphere".

Accolades 

Who's Lila? was shortlisted as a finalist for the 'Best Overseas Game' category of the 2022 indiePlay China Indie Game Award.

References

External links 
 

2022 video games
2020s horror video games
Psychological horror games
Video games developed in Russia
Indie video games
Alternate reality games
Windows games
Windows-only games
Single-player video games